Shepard Menken (November 2, 1921 – January 2, 1999) was an American film, television, voice, radio character actor.

Early life
Menken began his career at the age of 11, when he started appearing on children's radio programs. After high school, Menken attended Columbia University, and later studied performing arts at the Neighborhood Playhouse Theatre and the Juilliard School of Music.

Career
Menken made his film debut in 1949 with a supporting role in The Red Menace, and eventually appeared onscreen in 17 movies. Menken worked steadily as a television actor, appearing on such series as I Love Lucy, I Spy, and The Wild Wild West. He was also in demand as a voice talent, working on animated cartoons for Hanna-Barbera, UPA, and Marvel Productions, as well as advertising spots for StarKist Tuna and Mattel Toys; his was the voice intoning, "The only way to fly!" in Western Airlines' spots in the 1960s. Menken voiced the Clyde Crashcup character in The Alvin Show, as well as the character Tonto in the 1966-69 animated series The Lone Ranger. He also voiced the Spelling Bee and Chroma the Great in the 1970 live-action/animated film The Phantom Tollbooth, and provided the voice for the title character in Rikki-Tikki-Tavi. In 1963, Menken formed his own company, Malibu Films, which specialized in educational and industrial films.

Death
Shepard Menken died in the Los Angeles neighborhood of Woodland Hills two months after his 77th birthday.

Selected filmography
 The Great Caruso (1951) as Fucito
 David and Bathsheba (1951) as Police Guard (uncredited) 
 Tangier Incident (1953)
 Captain John Smith and Pocahontas (1953) as Natanquas 
 Killers From Space (1953) as Major Clift
 I Love Lucy, Episode 77, 'Lucy Has Her Eyes Examined', billed as "Shep Menken" (1953) as the optometrist
 King Richard and the Crusaders (1954) as Muezzin (uncredited)
 Bengal Brigade (1954) as Bulbir

References

External links

Shepard Menken at the American Film Institute Catalog
Shepard Menken at AllMovie

1921 births
1999 deaths
American male voice actors
American male radio actors
American male film actors
Male actors from New York City
20th-century American male actors
Juilliard School alumni
Columbia University alumni
Burials at Mount Sinai Memorial Park Cemetery